Barnardichthys fulvomarginata is a species of sole endemic to the coasts of South Africa.  This species grows to a length of  TL.  This species is the only known member of its genus.

References
 

Soleidae
Monotypic fish genera
Fish of South Africa
Marine fish of Africa
Taxa named by Paul Chabanaud